Roadside conservation is a conservation strategy in Australia and other countries where Road verge flora and habitats are protected or improved. The general aim is to conserve or increase the amount of native flora species; especially where that work will lead to higher conservation value, for example providing food or habitat for rare or endangered native fauna.

Issues
Potential benefits of roadside conservation strategies can include: 
 Maintenance of the biodiversity of the roadsides
 Sustaining available corridors for fauna movement and habitat
 Preserving remnants of native vegetation adjoining man-made environments

Problems with the maintaining of roadsides include:
 Removal, cutting of native vegetation
 Conflicts with road safety, such as foliage growth which restricts visibility for road users
 Work-load due to the extent of roadsides (i.e. the great length)

Western Australia
Formal recognition of the importance of roadside reserves occurred in the 1960s when then-Premier of Western Australia, the Hon. David Brand, ensured all new roads in Western Australia would have road reserves at least 40 metres wider than that needed for transport purposes.

Notes

Urban studies and planning terminology
Hydrology and urban planning
Environmental design
Nature conservation in Australia